Andrea Johanna Maria Vissers (born 29 February 1952) is a Dutch rower. She competed in the women's double sculls event at the 1976 Summer Olympics.

References

External links
 

1952 births
Living people
Dutch female rowers
Olympic rowers of the Netherlands
Rowers at the 1976 Summer Olympics
Rowers from Amsterdam
21st-century Dutch women
20th-century Dutch women